Rosny-sous-Bois is a French railway station in Rosny-sous-Bois, Seine-Saint-Denis département, in Île-de-France region.

Location 
The station is at kilometric point 12.631 of Paris-Mulhouse railway. Its altitude is 69 m.

Service

Facilities 
The counter in the building is open every day. The station is equipped with automatic ticket machines, real time traffic information systems and facilities for disabled people.

Train service 
Rosny–Bois Perrier is served by RER E trains coming from or bound to Villiers-sur-Marne. Trains from or bound to Tournan call at the station only after 10 pm. The average waiting time in both directions is 15 minutes.

Connections 
The station is served by:

 RATP bus lines 116, 118 and 143
 Noctilien night bus line N142
 Titus bus lines 1, 2, 3 and 4

Museum 
The station hosts Rosny-Rail, a local railway museum.

References 

Réseau Express Régional stations
Railway stations in France opened in 1856